Evergestis serratalis is a species of moth in the family Crambidae. It is found in Ukraine, the Republic of Macedonia, Greece, Turkey and Russia.

The wingspan is about 21 mm. Adults are on wing in September.

References

Moths described in 1871
Evergestis
Moths of Asia
Moths of Europe